Morozovka is a rural locality (a selo) and the administrative center of Morozovskoye Rural Settlement, Rossoshansky District, Voronezh Oblast, Russia. The population was 1,239 as of 2010. There are 18 streets.

Geography 
Morozovka is located 19 km southeast of Rossosh (the district's administrative centre) by road. Rossosh is the nearest rural locality.

References 

Rural localities in Rossoshansky District